is a railway station in Miyazaki, Miyazaki Prefecture, Japan, operated by the Kyushu Railway Company (JR Kyushu).

Lines
The station is the terminus of the Miyazaki Kūkō Line.

See also
Miyazaki Airport
List of railway stations in Japan
Airport rail link

External links

JR Kyushu station information 

Railway stations in Miyazaki Prefecture
Stations of Kyushu Railway Company
Airport railway stations in Japan
Railway stations in Japan opened in 1996
Miyazaki (city)